Gabriela Preissová, née Gabriela Sekerová, sometimes used pen name Matylda Dumontová (23 March 1862 in Kutná Hora – 27 March 1946 in Prague), was a Czech writer and playwright.  Her play Její pastorkyňa was the basis for the opera Jenůfa by Leoš Janáček, as well as a film by Miroslav Cikán. His earlier opera The Beginning of a Romance was also based on one of her stories.

Preissová mostly wrote stories full of optimism and the joy of life idealising village life. Her stories first appeared in the early 1890s. The more significant appeared in a three-volume collection. Her books, written in the 1920s, were about the tragic rural life of the Carinthian Slavs, usually with a strong woman as a heroine. These dramas didn't achieve the artistic spontaneity of her early work. Themes of her stories were mostly the affairs of young lovers and the obstacles to their consummation. Some tales were set to music, such as Eva by Josef Bohuslav Foerster and Jenůfa, an opera by Janáček.

References
 Iveta Jusova. "Gabriela Preissová's Women-Centered Texts: Subverting the Myth of the Homogeneous Nation."  Slavic and East European Journal 49:1 (Spring 2005): 63–78.

External links
 

1862 births
1946 deaths
Czech women dramatists and playwrights
19th-century women writers
19th-century Czech dramatists and playwrights
20th-century women writers
20th-century Czech dramatists and playwrights
People from Kutná Hora
Burials at Vyšehrad Cemetery